Arthur C. Graesser (born 1950) is a professor of psychology and intelligent systems at the University of Memphis and is an honorary research fellow in education at the University of Oxford.

He has served as the editor of the Journal of Educational Psychology
and Discourse Processes, has been president of four scientific societies, and has published over 600 scientific articles and three books, garnering over 30,000 citations.

He is widely known for his role in the development of a range of intelligent tutoring systems, including the AutoTutor platform, and Operation ARA, co-developed with Diane F. Halpern and distributed by Pearson Education. He also co-led the development of Coh-Metrix computational tool that produces linguistic, coherence, and discourse measures on texts.

In 2018, Graesser was awarded the Harold W. McGraw Jr. Prize in Education.  Graesser has also been awarded the Distinguished Scientific Contribution Award from the Society for Text and Discourse  and the Distinguished Contributions of Applications of Psychology to Education and Training Award from the American Psychological Association. Graesser has also been awarded a Lifetime Achievement Award by the International Society for Artificial Intelligence in Education, one of only two such awards bestowed as of 2023.

Graesser received his Ph.D. in psychology from the University of California, San Diego. He has graduated 32 doctoral students.

References

External links 
Graesser's personal webpage

American cognitive scientists
American educational psychologists
Computational psychologists
Applied linguists
Second language writing
1950 births
Living people
University of California, San Diego alumni
University of Memphis faculty
Place of birth missing (living people)